The Texas Campaign was the first front in the Mexican–American War, fought between the United States and Mexico. The front started with a Mexican assault near Brownsville. US forces were forced to surrender after hours of resisting, which led President James K. Polk to declare war on Mexico. After the United States defeated a larger Mexican Army at Palo Alto and Resaca de la Palma, Mexican Forces led by Mariano Arista retreated out of Texas.

External links
 Battle report and list of casualties
 A Continent Divided: The U.S.-Mexico War, Center for Greater Southwestern Studies, the University of Texas at Arlington

 
1846 in Texas
Battles of the Mexican–American War
1846 in the Mexican-American War
Invasions of the United States